Stonestreet may refer to:

People
Charles H. Stonestreet (1813–1885), American Roman Catholic priest
Eric Stonestreet (born 1971), American actor
Jess Stonestreet Jackson, Jr. (1930–2011), American wine entrepreneur and horsebreeder.
Lisa Gluskin Stonestreet (born 1968), American poet

Other
Stonestreet One, American software company
Stonestreet: Who Killed the Centerfold Model?, American television movie
Stonestreets Coaches, Australian bus company

See also
Stone Street (disambiguation)